Patricia Craig (born 1940s) is a writer, anthologist and literary critic from Northern Ireland, living in Antrim, County Antrim.

Personal life
She was born in Belfast to Nora (née Brady) and Andy Craig and attended St Dominic's Grammar School for Girls before studying at the Belfast School of Art and then at the Central School of Arts and Crafts, London (where she obtained a Diploma in Art & Design, Hons.). She returned to Northern Ireland in 1999. She is married to the Welsh artist Jeffrey Morgan.

Career
In the late 1960s, Craig was at Notre Dame Convent School in Battersea, working as an art mistress, but longed to have a literary career. Since then, she has written memoirs, edited several anthologies and written articles for newspapers. In London she began to collaborate with Mary Cadogan, editing several books on children's literature.  Their first book, You’re a Brick Angela!, became a classic.

On her return to Northern Ireland she began to write books with an Irish theme.  One of the first was a biography of Brian Moore which was described by the critic Seamus Deane as 'a crisp and intelligent account of a man and a writer for whom Craig's clean and incisive approach seems perfectly appropriate'. Perhaps her most popular book was the memoir Asking for Trouble (1987) which details her schooldays, culminating in her expulsion from school.

Awards
She was Honorary Lecturer at Queen's University Belfast where she was appointed to the Board of the Seamus Heaney Centre for Poetry.

Publications
 You're a Brick Angela!: The Girls' Story 1839–1985 (1976) 
 Women and Children First: The Fiction of Two World Wars (1978)
 The Lady Investigates: Women Detectives and Spies in Fiction (1986)
 The Oxford Book of English Detective Stories  (1990)
 The Rattle of The North: An Anthology of Ulster Prose (1992)
 The Penguin Book of British Comic Stories (1992)
 The Oxford Book of Modern Women's Stories (1994)
 The Oxford Book of Schooldays (1995)
 The Oxford Book of Travel Stories (1996)
 The Oxford Book of Ireland (1998)
 Twelve Irish Ghost Stories (1998) 
 The Belfast Anthology (1999)
 The Oxford Book of Detective Stories (2000)
 Brian Moore: A Biography (2002)
 Asking for Trouble (2008)
 A Twisted Root – Ancestral Entanglements in Ireland (2012)
 Bookworm, A Memoir of Childhood Reading (2015)

Notes

References

External links
  Patricia Craig's articles and book reviews in The Independent

1940s births
Living people
20th-century biographers
20th-century Irish women writers
20th-century women writers from Northern Ireland
21st-century biographers
21st-century Irish women writers
21st-century memoirists
21st-century women writers from Northern Ireland
Alumni of Belfast School of Art
Alumni of the Central School of Art and Design
Irish literary critics
Irish memoirists
Irish women memoirists
People associated with Queen's University Belfast
People educated at St Dominic's Grammar School for Girls
Women anthologists
Women biographers
Women literary critics
Writers from Belfast